Vasily Nikolayevich Likhachyov (5 January 1952, Gorky – 8 April 2019) was a Russian politician, the Permanent Representative for Russia to the European Council (1998), and Deputy Minister of Justice in Russia. Since 2011 until his death he was a Russian State Duma deputy from the Communist Party of the Russian Federation.

Likhachyov was the son of Nina F. Likhachyova and was married to Nailya Imatovna Taktasheva and had two daughters.

Biography
In 1975 he graduated from Kazan State University and obtained a degree of PhD in Law. He was a Fellow of Russian Academy of Natural Sciences, an Associate Member of Tatarstan Republic Academy of Sciences.

In 1978–1988 he was an associate professor in Kazan University. During the period of 1982–1983 he was lecturing in National Law school of Guinea-Bissau Republic. In 1987–1988 he was a lecturer in the University of Madagascar Republic.

From 1991 to 1995 he was holding an office of Vice-president of Tatarstan Republic. In 1995–1998 he was a Chair of the National Council of Tatarstan Republic and a chairman assistant of the Federation Council of the Federal Assembly of the Russian Federation. From 1998 to 2003 he was a Permanent Representative from Russian Federation in European Communities, Brussel. In 2004 he was elected as a representative from the legislative body of Republic Ingushetia government to the Federation Council. In 2010 he was appointed a Deputy Minister of Justice of Russian Federation and stayed in this office till 2011.
He was a member of Duma Committee on the Commonwealth of Independent States and Connections with Countrymen. He authored ten monographs and more than 500 scientific articles. He had a diplomatic rank of Ambassador Extraordinary and Plenipotentiary.

Awards
 Order of Honour (1996)
 Order for Merit to the Fatherland Fourth Class (2007)

References

Communist Party of the Russian Federation members
Sixth convocation members of the State Duma (Russian Federation)
1952 births
2019 deaths
Politicians from Nizhny Novgorod
Burials at Arskoe Cemetery
Members of the Federation Council of Russia (after 2000)
Ambassador Extraordinary and Plenipotentiary (Russian Federation)